The term Greek legislative election, 1910 may refer to:

 Greek legislative election, August 1910
 Greek legislative election, November 1910